Jiang Zemin (17 August 1926 – 30 November 2022) was a Chinese politician who served as general secretary of the Chinese Communist Party (CCP) from 1989 to 2002, as chairman of the Central Military Commission from 1989 to 2004, and as president of China from 1993 to 2003. Jiang was paramount leader of China from 1989 to 2002. He was the core leader of the third generation of Chinese leadership, one of four core leaders alongside Mao Zedong, Deng Xiaoping and Xi Jinping.

Born in Yangzhou, Jiangsu, Jiang joined the CCP while he was in college. After the establishment of the People's Republic of China in 1949, he received training at the Stalin Automobile Works in Moscow in the 1950s, later returning to Shanghai in 1962 to serve in various institutes, later being sent between 1970-1972 to Romania as part of an expert team to establish machinery manufacturing plants in the country. After 1979, he was appointed as the vice chair of two commissions by vice premier Gu Mu to oversee the newly-established special economic zones (SEZs). He became the vice minister of the newly-established Ministry of Electronics Industry and a member of the CCP Central Committee in 1982.

Jiang was appointed as the mayor of Shanghai in 1985, later being promoted to its Communist Party secretary, as well as a member of the CCP Politburo, in 1987. Jiang came to power unexpectedly as a compromise candidate following his1989 Tiananmen Square protests and massacre, when he replaced Zhao Ziyang as CCP general secretary after Zhao was ousted for his support for the student movement. As the involvement of the "Eight Elders" in Chinese politics steadily declined, Jiang consolidated his hold on power to become the "paramount leader" in the country during the 1990s. Urged by Deng Xiaoping's southern tour in 1992, Jiang officially introduced the term "socialist market economy" in his speech during the 14th CCP National Congress held later that year, which accelerated "opening up and reform".

Under Jiang's leadership, China experienced substantial economic growth with the continuation of market reforms. The returning of Hong Kong from the United Kingdom in 1997 and of Macau from Portugal in 1999, and entry into the World Trade Organisation in 2001, were landmark moments of his era. China also witnessed improved relations with the outside world, while the Communist Party maintained its tight control over the state. Jiang faced criticism over human rights abuses, including the crackdown on the Falun Gong movement. His contributions to party doctrine, known as the "Three Represents", were written into the CCP constitution in 2002. Jiang gradually vacated his official leadership titles from 2002 to 2005, being succeeded in these roles by Hu Jintao, although he and his political faction continued to influence affairs until much later. On 30 November 2022, Jiang died from leukemia and multiple organ failure in Shanghai.

Early life 

Jiang Zemin was born in the city of Yangzhou, Jiangsu, on 17 August 1926. His ancestral home was the Jiangcun Village in Jingde County, Anhui. This was also the hometown of a number of prominent figures in Chinese academic and intellectual establishments. Jiang grew up during the years of Japanese occupation. His uncle and foster father, Jiang Shangqing, died fighting the Japanese in 1939 and was considered in Jiang Zemin's time to be a national hero. After Shangqing's death, Zemin became his male heir.

Jiang attended the Department of Electrical Engineering at the National Central University in Japanese-occupied Nanjing before transferring to National Chiao Tung University (now Shanghai Jiao Tong University). He graduated there in 1947 with a bachelor's degree in electrical engineering. Jiang joined the Chinese Communist Party when he was in college. After the establishment of the People's Republic of China, Jiang received his training at the Stalin Automobile Works in Moscow in the 1950s. He also worked for Changchun's First Automobile Works.

In 1962, he returned to Shanghai and became the deputy director of the Shanghai Electric Research Institute. In 1966, he was appointed as the director and deputy party secretary of a thermal engineering research institute in Wuhan, which was established by the First Ministry of Machine Building. When the Cultural Revolution began in the same year,
he did not suffer greatly during the turmoil, but was pulled down from his position as director of the institute and was sent to a May Seventh Cadre School. In 1970, after leaving the cadre school, he became the deputy director of the Foreign Affairs Bureau of the ministry and was sent to the Socialist Republic of Romania, where he served as head of the expert team to establish fifteen machinery manufacturing plants in the country. After the completion of his mission in 1972, he returned to China.

In 1979, following a thawing of diplomatic relations between China and the United States, Deng Xiaoping decided to encourage special economic zones (SEZs) as part of his Four Modernizations. China's State Council established two ministerial commissions to increase trade and foreign investment. The commissions were headed by vice premier Gu Mu, who appointed Jiang as vice chairman of both commissions, a position equivalent to vice minister. Jiang's role was to ensure these SEZs increased economic prosperity without becoming "conduits" for foreign ideology. In 1980, Jiang headed a delegation which toured other SEZs in twelve countries; upon his return, he issued a radical report which recommended allowing local authorities to issue tax breaks and land leases, and increasing the power of foreign joint ventures. The report initially "caused consternation" among party leaders, but his pragmatic and empirical presentation appealed to Deng Xiaoping. His proposals were approved at the National People's Congress, cementing Jiang as an "early implementer" of Deng Xiaoping Theory.

In March 1982, he was pushed out as vice chairman of two commissions. After pressure from premier Gu and Shanghai mayor Wang Daohan, "ardent reformist" Zhao Ziyang appointed Jiang as the first vice minister and party secretary of the newly-established Ministry of Electronics Industry.

At the 12th Party Congress held in September 1982, Jiang became a member of the Central Committee of the CCP, which determines policy and elects the members of the Politburo.

Rise to power 
In 1985, Jiang became mayor of Shanghai. Jiang received mixed reviews as mayor. Many of his critics dismissed him as a "flower pot", a Chinese term for someone who only seems useful, but actually gets nothing done. Many credited Shanghai's growth during the period to Zhu Rongji. Jiang was an ardent believer, during this period, in Deng Xiaoping's economic reforms. In an attempt to curb student discontent in 1986, Jiang recited the Gettysburg Address in English in front of a group of student protesters.

At the 13th National Congress of the CCP held in October 1987, Jiang was promoted from mayor to Shanghai party secretary, the most powerful position in the city, reporting directly to the central government. He also joined the Politburo of the Chinese Communist Party, in accordance with customs for party secretaries of major cities.

In 1989, former general secretary Hu Yaobang died; he had previously been purged in January 1987 and accused of supporting "bourgeois liberalization". His death catalyzed the Tiananmen Square protest, leading to an ideological crisis between "liberals" (who supported Deng's aggressive reforms) and "conservatives" (who favored slower change). After the World Economic Herald tried to publish a eulogy rehabilitating Hu and praising his reformist stance, Jiang took control of the newspaper's editorial board. As the protests continued to grow, the Party imposed martial law in Beijing. In Shanghai, 100,000 protestors marched in the streets, and 450 students went on a hunger strike. After the third day, Jiang personally met with them to assure them that the Party shared their goals, and to promise future dialogue. He simultaneously sent a telegram to the Central Committee firmly supporting their martial law declaration. His careful public appeals were well-received by both pro-democracy students and socialist party elders. On 20 May 1989, paramount leader Deng Xiaoping decided to appoint Jiang as the new general secretary, replacing Zhao Ziyang, who had supported the protestors. Jiang was selected as a compromise candidate over Tianjin's Li Ruihuan, premier Li Peng, elders Li Xiannian, Chen Yun, and the retired elders to become the new general secretary. Before that, he had been considered to be an unlikely candidate.

Jiang was elevated to the country's top job in 1989 with a fairly small power base inside the party, and thus, very little actual power. His most reliable allies were the powerful party elders Chen Yun and Li Xiannian. He was believed to be simply a transitional figure until a more stable successor government to Deng could be put in place. Other prominent Party and military figures like President Yang Shangkun and his brother Yang Baibing were believed to be planning a coup.

At the first meeting of the new CCP Politburo Standing Committee, after the Tiananmen Square massacre of 1989, Jiang criticized the previous period as "hard on the economy, soft on politics" and advocated increasing political thought work. Anne-Marie Brady wrote that "Jiang Zemin was a long time political cadre with a nose for ideological work and its importance. This meeting marked the beginning of a new era in propaganda and political thought work in China." Soon after, the Central Propaganda Department was given more resources and power, "including the power to go in to the propaganda-related work units and cleanse the ranks of those who had been supportive of the democracy movement." The Politburo also issued a list of "seven things" regarding "matters of universal concern to the masses", with party corruption as the top priority.

In the first few years, Jiang depended on the support of Deng Xiaoping to remain in power, which forced Jiang into an "ultranationalist stance" towards Taiwan and the US. Jiang had supported Deng's calls against "bourgeois liberalization", but while Jiang was seen as a "thoughtful reformer", he "[skewed] to the more conservative views of the elders and his Politburo colleagues". Deng was far more supportive of reforms, saying that "deviating to the Left is an even greater danger" than deviating to the right.

Deng grew critical of Jiang's leadership in 1992. During Deng's southern tour, he subtly suggested that the pace of reform was not fast enough. Jiang grew ever more cautious, and rallied behind Deng's reforms completely. Jiang coined the new "socialist market economy" to move China's centrally-planned socialist economy into essentially a government-regulated capitalist market economy. It was a huge step to take in the realization of Deng's "Socialism with Chinese characteristics." At the same time, Jiang elevated many of his supporters from Shanghai to high government positions, after regaining Deng's confidence. He abolished the outdated Central Advisory Committee in 1992, an advisory body composed of revolutionary party elders. He became general secretary of the Chinese Communist Party and chairman of the Central Military Commission in 1989, followed by his election to the presidency in March 1993.

Leadership

Economic development 
In the early 1990s, post-Tiananmen economic reforms by Zhu Rongji with Jiang's support had stabilized and the country was on a consistent growth trajectory. At the same time, China faced myriad economic and social problems. At Deng's state funeral in 1997, Jiang delivered the elder statesman's eulogy. Jiang had inherited a China rampant with political corruption, and regional economies growing too rapidly for the stability of the entire country. Deng's policy that "some areas can get rich before others" led to an opening wealth gap between coastal regions and the interior provinces. The unprecedented economic growth and the deregulation in a number of heavy industries led to the closing of many state-owned enterprises (SOEs), breaking many people's iron rice bowl and initially removing as many as 40 million jobs from SOEs. As a result, unemployment rates skyrocketed, rising as high as 40% in some urban areas. Stock markets fluctuated greatly. The scale of rural migration into urban areas was unprecedented anywhere, and little was being done to address an ever-increasing urban-rural wealth gap. Official reports put the figure on the percentage of China's GDP being moved and abused by corrupt officials at 10%. Jiang's biggest aim in the economy was stability, and he believed that a stable government with highly centralized power would be a prerequisite, choosing to postpone political reform, which in many facets of governance exacerbated the ongoing problems. After the coastal regions and SEZs were sufficiently developed, Jiang worked to reduce geographic disparities by encouraging richer cities to "provide financial, technological, and managerial assistance to the poorer, western ones."

Foreign policy 

Under Jiang's leadership, China continued its style of developmental diplomacy which had been adopted under Deng Xiaoping. China's international behavior was generally both pragmatic and predictable. During Jiang's presidency, serious flare-ups between China and the United States occurred. Nonetheless, Jiang's foreign policy was for the most part passive and non-confrontational. 

In July 1993, the United States Navy stopped a Chinese container ship, the Yinhe, based on the incorrect suspicion that it was carrying chemical weapon precursors bound for Iran. Although China denied the allegation, the United States cut off the Yinhe's GPS, causing it to lose direction and anchor on the high seas for twenty-four days until it acceded to an inspection. There were no chemical precursors on the ship. Although China sought a formal apology, the United States refused to apologize and refused to pay compensation. Despite the humiliation of the Yinhe incident, Jiang took a stance of goodwill towards the United States and adopted the "sixteen-characters formula" for working with the United States: "enhancing confidence, reducing troubles, expanding cooperation, and avoiding confrontation."

Jiang oversaw a series of missile tests in the waters surrounding Taiwan in 1996 in protest to the Republic of China government under President Lee Teng-hui, who had been seen as moving its foreign policy away from the One-China policy. 

Jiang went on a state visit to the United States in 1997, drawing various crowds in protest from the Tibet Independence Movement to supporters of the Chinese democracy movement. He made a speech at Harvard University, part of it in English, but could not escape questions on democracy and freedom. In the official summit meeting with president Bill Clinton, the tone was relaxed as they sought common ground while largely ignoring areas of disagreement. Clinton would visit China in June 1998, and vowed that China and the United States were partners in the world, and not adversaries.

When American-led NATO bombed the Chinese Embassy in Belgrade in 1999, Jiang seemed to have put up a harsh stance for show at home, but in reality only performed symbolic gestures of protest, and no solid action. Jiang deemed the United States-China bilateral relation too important to be harmed in the emotion of the moment and sought to soothe the Chinese public's outrage.

The Hainan island incident was another tense event in the China-United States relations which occurred during Jiang's presidency. On April 1, 2001, a United States US EP-3 surveillance aircraft collided mid-air with a Chinese Shenyang J-8 jet fighter over the South China Sea. China sought a formal apology, and accepted United States Secretary of State Colin Powell's expression of "very sorry" as sufficient. The incident nonetheless created negative feelings towards the United States by the Chinese public and increased public feelings of Chinese nationalism.

A personal friend of former Canadian prime minister Jean Chrétien, Jiang strengthened China's economic stature abroad, attempting to establish cordial relations with countries whose trade is largely confined to the American economic sphere.

Media depiction 
The People's Daily and CCTV-1's 7 pm Xinwen Lianbo each had Jiang-related events as the front-page or top stories, a fact that remained until Hu Jintao's media administrative changes in 2006. Jiang appeared casual in front of Western media, and gave an unprecedented interview with Mike Wallace of CBS in 2000 at Beidaihe. He would often use foreign languages in front of the camera; once, he gave a 40-minute speech entirely in Russian. In an encounter with Hong Kong reporter Sharon Cheung in 2000 regarding the central government's apparent "imperial order" of supporting Tung Chee-hwa to seek a second term as Chief Executive of Hong Kong, Jiang scolded the Hong Kong journalists as "too simple, sometimes naive" in English. Before he transferred power to a younger generation of leaders, Jiang had his theory of Three Represents written into the Party's constitution, alongside Marxism–Leninism, Mao Zedong Thought, and Deng Xiaoping Theory at the 16th CCP Congress in 2002.

Crackdown on Falun Gong 

In June 1999, Jiang established an extralegal department, the 6–10 Office, to crack down on Falun Gong. Cook and Lemish state this was because Jiang was worried that the popular new religious movement was "quietly infiltrating the CCP and state apparatus." On 20 July, security forces arrested thousands of Falun Gong organizers they identified as leaders. The persecution that followed was characterized a nationwide campaign of propaganda, as well as the large-scale arbitrary imprisonment and coercive reeducation of Falun Gong organizers, sometimes resulting in death due to mistreatment in detention.

Gradual retirement 

In the run-up to the 16th National Congress of the CCP, Hu Jintao had "almost unanimous support" to become the new General Secretary of the Chinese Communist Party. To maintain China's image as a stable and respected country, Jiang and Hu emphasized their unity, striving to make this transition the first "smooth and harmonious" one in the PRC's history. Jiang stepped down as general secretary and left the Politburo Standing Committee, but retained the chairmanship of the Central Military Commission, which controlled the army and the nation's foreign policy. Jiang would continue conselling Hu from "behind the curtain", and it was formally agreed that Jiang would be "consulted on all matters of state importance". Both men also reached a "tacit understanding" that Hu would not be considered a "core" leader like Jiang, Deng and Mao.

At the 16th Party Congress, the majority of new members for Standing Committee were considered part of Jiang's so-called "Shanghai Clique", the most prominent being vice president Zeng Qinghong, who had served as Jiang's chief of staff for many years, and vice premier Huang Ju, a former party secretary of Shanghai.

After Hu succeeded Jiang as general secretary, the latter continued to "[dominate] public life" for several years. The South China Morning Post announced that "a new era has begun in China. But it is not that of Vice President Hu Jintao [...] Rather, it is a new era of President Jiang Zemin, who has just stepped down as the Party's general secretary." Early in the 2003 SARS crisis, Jiang remained conspicuously silent, and observers were divided over whether it signified his waning influence, or respect for Hu. It has been argued that the institutional arrangements created by the 16th Congress left Jiang in a position where he could not exercise much influence.

Although Jiang retained the chairmanship of the powerful Central Military Commission, most members of the commission were professional military men. Liberation Army Daily, a publication thought to represent the views of the CMC majority, printed an article on 11 March 2003 which quotes two army delegates as saying, "Having one center is called 'loyalty', while having two centers will result in 'problems.'" This was interpreted as a criticism of Jiang's attempt to exercise dual leadership with Hu on the model of Deng Xiaoping.

On 19 September 2004, after the 4th Plenary Session of the 16th Central Committee, Jiang, at the age of 78, relinquished his post as chairman of the party's Central Military Commission, his last post in the party. Six months later in March 2005, Jiang resigned his last significant post, chairman of the Central Military Commission of the state, which marked the end of Jiang's political career. This followed weeks of speculation that forces inside the party were pressing Jiang to step aside. Jiang's term was supposed to have lasted until 2007. Hu also succeeded Jiang as the CMC chairman, but, in an apparent political defeat for Jiang, General Xu Caihou, and not Zeng Qinghong was appointed to succeed Hu as vice chairman, as was initially speculated. This power transition formally marked the end of Jiang's era in China, which roughly lasted from 1989 to 2004.

Official appearances after retirement 
Jiang continued to make official appearances after giving up his last title in 2004. In China's strictly defined protocol sequence, Jiang's name always appeared immediately after Hu Jintao's and in front of the remaining sitting members of the CCP Politburo Standing Committee. In 2007, Jiang was seen with Hu Jintao on stage at a ceremony celebrating the 80th anniversary of the founding of the People's Liberation Army, and toured the Military Museum of the Chinese People's Revolution with Li Peng, Zhu Rongji, and other former senior officials. On 8 August 2008, Jiang appeared at the opening ceremony of the Beijing Olympics. He also stood beside Hu Jintao during the mass parade celebrating the 60th anniversary of the People's Republic of China in October 2009.

Beginning in July 2011, false reports of Jiang's death began circulating on the news media outside of mainland China and on the internet. While Jiang may indeed have been ill and receiving treatment, the rumors were denied by official sources. On 9 October 2011, Jiang made his first public appearance since his premature obituary in Beijing at a celebration to commemorate the 100th anniversary of the Xinhai Revolution. Jiang reappeared at the 18th Party Congress in October 2012, and took part in the 65th Anniversary banquet of the founding of the People's Republic of China in October 2014. At the banquet he sat next to Xi Jinping, who had then succeeded Hu Jintao as CCP general secretary. In September 2015, Jiang attended the parade celebrating 70 years since end of World War II; there, Jiang again sat next to Xi Jinping and Hu Jintao. He appeared on 29 May 2017 at Shanghai Technology University.

After Xi Jinping assumed power in 2012, Jiang's position in the protocol sequence of leaders retreated; while he was often seated next to Xi Jinping at official events, his name was often reported after all standing members of the Communist Party's Politburo. Jiang reappeared at the 19th Party Congress on 18 October 2017. He appeared on 29 July 2019 at the funeral of former premier Li Peng. He also attended the 70th anniversary of the founding of the People's Republic of China mass parade in October 2019, marking his last public appearance prior to his death. He did not attend the 20th Party Congress in October 2022.

Family and personal life 
Jiang married Wang Yeping, also a native of Yangzhou, in 1949. She was his cousin, as Jiang's adoptive mother was Wang's aunt. Wang graduated from Shanghai International Studies University. They had two sons together, Jiang Mianheng and Jiang Miankang. Jiang Mianheng went on to be an academic and businessman, working within the Chinese space program, and founded Grace Semiconductor Manufacturing Corporation.

It is believed that Jiang had a long-running friendship with the singer Song Zuying, Chen Zhili, and others. Following the rise of Xi Jinping, Song and other Jiang loyalists, including her brother Song Zuyu, fell under investigation for corruption.

Jiang had a passable command of several foreign languages, including English and Russian. He enjoyed engaging foreign visitors in small talk on arts and literature in their native language, in addition to singing foreign songs in the original. Jiang remains the only paramount leader of China known to be able to speak in English.

Death 

Jiang died on 30 November 2022, at the age of 96, in Shanghai. According to the Chinese state media Xinhua News Agency, he died at 12:13 pm from leukemia and multiple organ failures.

On the day of Jiang's death, the government released a notice that the national flags would be flown half-staff in key locations of Beijing and diplomatic missions abroad. Foreigners were not invited to attend official mourning activities.

Legacy 

The policies of his successors, Hu Jintao and Wen Jiabao, have widely been seen as efforts to address perceived imbalances and move away from a sole focus on economic growth toward a broader view of development which incorporates non-economic factors such as health and the environment.

Domestically, Jiang's legacy and reputation is mixed. While some people attributed the period of relative stability and growth in the 1990s to Jiang's term, others argue that Jiang did little to correct systemic imbalance and an accumulation of problems which resulted from years of breakneck-pace economic reforms, leaving the next administration facing innumerable challenges, some of which may have been too late to solve.

The fact that Jiang rose to power as the direct beneficiary of the political aftermath of Tiananmen has shaped the perception of his rule. Following the Tiananmen protests, Jiang threw his support behind elder Chen Yun's conservative economic policies, but subsequently changed his allegiance to Deng Xiaoping's reform-oriented agenda following the latter's "Southern Tour". This shift was not only seen as the exercise of a political opportunist, it also sowed confusion among party loyalists in regards to what direction the party was headed or what the party truly believed in. While continued economic reforms resulted in an explosion of wealth around the country, it also led to the formation of special interest groups in many sectors of the economy, and the exercise of state power without any meaningful oversight. This opened the way for the sub-optimal distribution of the fruits of growth, and an expanding culture of corruption among bureaucrats and party officials.

Historian and former Xinhua journalist Yang Jisheng wrote that Jiang might well have been given a positive historical assessment had it not been for his decision to 'overstay his welcome' by remaining in the Central Military Commission post after Hu had formally assumed the party leadership. Moreover, Jiang took credit for all the gains made during the 13 years "between 1989 and 2002", which not only evoked the memories of Jiang being a beneficiary of Tiananmen, but also neglected the economic foundations laid by Deng, whose authority was still paramount until the mid-1990s. Additionally, Jiang was also criticized for his insistence on writing the "Three Represents" into the party and state constitutions (see below), which Yang called Jiang's attempt at "self-deification", i.e., that he saw himself as a visionary along the same lines as Deng and Mao. Yang contended, "The 'Three Represents' is just common sense. It is not a proper theoretical framework. It's what any ruler would tell the people to justify the continued rule of the governing party."

Jiang did not specialize in economics, and in 1997 handed most of the economic governance of the country to Zhu Rongji, who became Chinese premier, and remained in office through the Asian financial crisis. Under their joint leadership, Mainland China sustained an average of 8% GDP growth annually, achieving the highest rate of per capita economic growth in major world economies, raising eyebrows around the world with its astonishing speed. This was mostly achieved by continuing the process of a transition to a market economy. Additionally, he helped increase China's international standing with China joining the World Trade Organization in 2001 and Beijing winning the bid to host the 2008 Summer Olympics.

"Three Represents" 

Formally, Jiang's theory of "Three Represents" was enshrined in both Party and State constitutions as an "important thought", following in the footsteps of Marxism-Leninism, Mao Zedong Thought and Deng Xiaoping Theory. However, the theory lacked staying power. By the time of the 17th Party Congress in 2007, the Scientific Outlook on Development had already been written into the constitution of the Communist Party, a mere five years after the Three Represents, overtaking the latter as the guiding ideology for much of Hu Jintao's term. While his successors paid lip service to "Three Represents" in official party documentation and speeches, no special emphasis was placed on the theory after Jiang left office. There was even speculation following Xi Jinping's assumption of CCP general secretary in 2012 that the Three Represents would eventually be dropped from the party's list of guiding ideologies.

The Three Represents justified the incorporation of the new capitalist business class into the party, and changed the founding ideology of the Chinese Communist Party from protecting the interests of the peasantry and workers to that of the "overwhelming majority of the people", a euphemism aimed at placating the growing entrepreneurial class. Conservative critics within the party, such as hardline leftist Deng Liqun, denounced this as betrayal of "true" communist ideology.

Other areas 
Some have also associated Jiang with the widespread corruption and cronyism that had become a notable feature of the Communist power apparatus since Jiang's years in power. In the military, the two vice-chairmen who sat atop the Central Military Commission hierarchy – nominally as assistants to then chairman Hu Jintao – Vice-Chairmen Xu Caihou and Guo Boxiong, were said to have obstructed Hu Jintao's exercise of power in the military. Xu and Guo were characterized as "Jiang's proxies in the military". Eventually, both men were reported to have taken massive bribes, and both fell under the axe of the anti-corruption campaign under Xi Jinping.

At the same time, many biographers of Jiang have noted his government resembled an oligarchy as opposed to an autocratic dictatorship. Many of the policies of his era had been attributed to others in government, notably premier Zhu Rongji. Jiang was also characterized as a leader who was mindful to seek the opinion of his close advisers. Jiang is often credited with the improvement in foreign relations during his term, but at the same time many Chinese have criticized him for being too conciliatory towards the United States and Russia. The issue of Chinese unification between the mainland and Taiwan gained ground during Jiang's term. The construction of the Qinghai–Tibet railway and the Three Gorges Dam began under Jiang's leadership.

Awards and honors 
:
 Grand Cross of the Order of the Southern Cross (23 November 1993)

:
 Royal Family Order of the Crown of Brunei (17 November 2000)

:
 Grand Cross of the Order of Merit (20 March 2000)

:
 Order of José Martí (21 November 1993)

:
 Order of the Great Star of Djibouti (18 August 1998)

:
 Grand Cross of the Order of Tahiti Nui (3 April 2001)

:
 Grand Cross of the Order of the Redeemer (22 April 2000)
 Athens Gold Medal (22 April 2000)

:
 Order of the Golden Eagle (19 November 1999)

:
 Grand Cross of the National Order of Mali (17 May 1996)

:
 Medal 'Bethlehem 2000' (15 April 2000)

:
 Medal of Pushkin (31 October 2007)

:
 Grand Cross of the Order of Good Hope (5 May 1999)

:
 First Class of the Order of the State of Republic of Turkey (19 April 2000)

:
 First Class of the Order of Prince Yaroslav the Wise (2 December 1995)

:
 Grand Cordon of the Order of the Liberator (17 April 2001)

Works

See also 
Toad worship, an internet meme spoofing Jiang
State visit by Jiang Zemin to Japan

Notes

References

Bibliography

Further reading 

Gilley, Bruce. Tiger on the Brink: Jiang Zemin and China's New Elite. Berkeley: University of California Press, 1998. 395pp. This was the first biography of Jiang to appear in the West. A comprehensive and highly readable journalistic account of Jiang's early years, his ascendancy within the Party bureaucracy, and his ultimate rise to power as Deng Xiaoping's successor in the wake of Tiananmen.
Kuhn, Robert Lawrence. The Man Who Changed China: The Life and Legacy of Jiang Zemin, Random House (English edition) 2005. Century Publishing Group, Shanghai (Chinese edition) 2005. The book is a general biography of Jiang with a more favorable stance towards him.

Lam, Willy Wo-Lap. "The Era of Jiang Zemin"; Prentice Hall, Singapore: 1999. General Jiang-era background information and analysis, not comprehensive biography.

External links 

 
1926 births
2022 deaths
Jiang Zemin family
Chinese Communist Party politicians from Jiangsu
General Secretaries and Chairmen of the Chinese Communist Party
Mayors of Shanghai
Nanjing University alumni
Politicians from Yangzhou
Presidents of the People's Republic of China
National Chiao Tung University (Shanghai) alumni
People's Republic of China politicians from Jiangsu
20th-century Chinese heads of government
21st-century Chinese politicians
Members of the 15th Politburo Standing Committee of the Chinese Communist Party
Members of the 14th Politburo Standing Committee of the Chinese Communist Party
Members of the 13th Politburo Standing Committee of the Chinese Communist Party
Chinese electrical engineers
Secretaries of the Communist Party Shanghai Committee
Recipients of the Order of Prince Yaroslav the Wise, 1st class
Grand Crosses of the National Order of Mali
Recipients of the Medal of Pushkin
Chinese expatriates in the Soviet Union
Chinese expatriates in Romania
Deaths from leukemia
Deaths from cancer in the People's Republic of China
Burials at sea